The Smurfs: Mission Vileaf is a platform video game developed by OSome Studio and published by Microids, released on 26 October 2021. This video game was based on the Belgian animated series The Smurfs (and in turn in the Belgian comic book series of the same name, created by Peyo).

Characters

 Papa Smurf
 Smurfette
 Hefty Smurf
 Brainy Smurf
 Chef Smurf
 Gargamel

Development 
On May 15, 2020 Microids announced a publishing deal with IMPS, the current worldwide licensors for The Smurfs, to make a new 3D game based on the franchise developed by OSome Studio. It was officially revealed on April 8, 2021 as The Smurfs: Mission Vileaf, and would be the first in an agreement to publish a series of Smurfs games over the next five years.

Release 
The game was originally slated to release simultaneously for Microsoft Windows, Nintendo Switch, PlayStation 4, and Xbox One on 26 October 2021 and PlayStation 5 and Xbox Series X/S in 2022, with special and collector's editions also being available for the first three consoles. On 14 October it was announced that the PlayStation 4 and Xbox One collector's editions were cancelled and the console versions were delayed until November. The Microsoft Windows version was released as originally planned on 26 October 2021 with the Nintendo Switch, PlayStation 4, Xbox One and versions released in November, and the PlayStation 5 and Xbox Series X/S released later that year. A version for Amazon Luna was made available on 4 November 2022.

References

2021 video games
3D platform games
Action-adventure games
Cooperative games
The Smurfs video games
PlayStation 4 games
PlayStation 5 games
Microïds games
Nintendo Switch games
Video games developed in France
Windows games
Xbox One games
Xbox Series X and Series S games
Multiplayer and single-player video games
OSome Studio games